Hemeiuș is a commune in Bacău County, Western Moldavia, Romania. It is composed of three villages: Fântânele, Hemeiuș, and Lilieci.

Princess Sophie of Albania died in Fântânele village in 1936.

Natives
 Walter Adolph
 Ion Th. Simionescu

References

Communes in Bacău County
Localities in Western Moldavia